Ethiopia participated at the 2017 Summer Universiade which was held in Taipei, Taiwan.

Ethiopia sent a delegation consisting of only 1 competitor for the event competing in a single sporting event. Ethiopia didn't claim any medals at the multi-sport event.

Participants

References 

2017 in Ethiopian sport
Nations at the 2017 Summer Universiade